South Carolina Highway 119 (SC 119) is a  state highway in the U.S. state of South Carolina. The highway connects the Georgia state line and Garnett.

Route description
SC 119 begins at the Georgia state line, within Jasper County, where the roadway continues as Georgia State Route 119 (Railroad Avenue). It travels to the north-northeast, through rural areas of Jasper and Hampton counties and has an intersection with U.S. Route 321 (Columbia Highway) in Garnett.

Major intersections

See also

References

External links

SC 119 at Virginia Highways' South Carolina Highways Annex

119
Transportation in Hampton County, South Carolina
Transportation in Jasper County, South Carolina